The 2015–16 Norfolk State Spartans men's basketball team represented Norfolk State University during the 2015–16 NCAA Division I men's basketball season. The Spartans, led by third year coach Robert Jones, played their home games at the Joseph G. Echols Memorial Hall and were members of the Mid-Eastern Athletic Conference. They finished the season 17–17, 12–4 in MEAC play to finish in a tie for second place. They defeated North Carolina Central in the quarterfinals of the MEAC tournament to advance to the semifinals where they lost to South Carolina State. They were invited to the CollegeInsider.com Tournament where they lost in the first round to Columbia.

Roster

Schedule

|-
!colspan=9 style="background:#; color:white;"| Regular season

|-
!colspan=9 style="background:#; color:white;"| MEAC tournament

|-
!colspan=9 style="background:#; color:white;"| CIT

References

Norfolk State Spartans men's basketball seasons
Norfolk State
Norfolk State
Norfolk State Spartans
Norfolk State Spartans